Urgunovo (Örgön) is a rural locality (a selo) in Uchalinsky Selsoviet, Uchalinsky District, Bashkortostan, Russia. The population was 569 as of 2010. There are 11 streets.

Geography 
Urgunovo is located 13 km north of Uchaly (the district's administrative centre) by road. Uchaly is the nearest rural locality.

References 

Rural localities in Uchalinsky District